Professor Debi Prasad Chattopadhyaya (November 5, 1933 – February 13, 2022), was educated at the University of Calcutta and was Deputy Minister of Health of India and Union Minister of Commerce and Industry. He founded the Indian Council of Philosophical Research, New Delhi, and served as its Chairman. Till the end of his life, he served as the Chairman of the Centre for Studies in Civilizations, and General Editor of the Project of History of Indian Science, Philosophy and Culture, which produced a multi-volume cultural history of India.

Chattopadhyaya has authored many books on culture and philosophy. In 2009 he was awarded the Padma Vibhushan, India's second highest civilian award.

Books
1967 Individuals and Societies: A Methodological Inquiry
1976 History, Individuals and World
1980 Rupa, Rasa O Sundara (in Bengali)
1988 Sri Aurobindo and Karl Marx
1990 Anthropology and Historiography of Science
1991 Induction, Probability and Skepticism
1997 Sociology, Ideology and Utopia

References

External links
 https://web.archive.org/web/20150627044324/http://www.icpr.in/pdf/Newsletter_Apr-Sept_2010.pdf

1933 births
2022 deaths
20th-century Indian philosophers
Chattopadhyay, D.P.
Chattopadhyay, D.P.
Recipients of the Padma Vibhushan in literature & education